Stanley G. Backman (November 15, 1885 – March 26, 1970) was an American football coach, college athletics administrator, military officer, and government administrator.  He served as the head football coach at the University of South Dakota from 1931 to 1933, compiling a record of 11–16–1.

A native of Cincinnati, Ohio, Backman was a three-year letter winner for the Ohio State Buckeyes football team, from 1908 to 1910.  He entered the United States Army in 1917 and served during World War I as a captain in the engineers.  Backman was dean of men at the University of Georgia and coached freshman football there from 1924 to 1926. During World War II, he was the commander of Manila in the Philippines, following the liberation of the city by Douglas MacArthur's forces.  After the war, Backman served in occupied Germany as member of the Diplomatic Corps with the Inter-Allied Rhineland Commission. In 1946, he was nominated by United States President Harry S. Truman to be a regional director within the War Assets Administration.

Backman moved to Henderson, North Carolina in 1954.  He died at Oteen Veterans Hospital there on  March 26, 1970.  Backman  was buried in  Arlington National Cemetery.

Head coaching record

References

External links
 

1885 births
1970 deaths
Georgia Bulldogs football coaches
Ohio State Buckeyes football players
South Dakota Coyotes football coaches
South Dakota Coyotes athletic directors
United States Army personnel of World War I
United States Army personnel of World War II
United States Army officers
Players of American football from Cincinnati
Burials at Arlington National Cemetery